Crash My Ride is a six-track EP from the alternative rock band Stagecoach released in 2010.

The track "Axe Behind My Back" was used in the trailer for the film Killing Bono.

Track listing

Personnel

 Luke Barham - rhythm guitar, lead vocals
 Nick Tanner - lead guitar
 John Harrington - bass guitar, backing vocals
 Tom 'Chop' Lewis - mandolin, synthesizer, backing vocals
 Matt Emery - drums, percussion, backing vocals

References

2010 EPs
Alcopop! Records EPs